Chongqing IFS T1 is a supertall skyscraper in Chongqing, China. Construction started in 2012 and was completed in 2016.

See also
List of tallest buildings in Chongqing

References

Skyscraper office buildings in Chongqing
Skyscraper hotels in Chongqing
Skyscrapers in Chongqing